Fascaplysin is a marine alkaloid based on 12H-pyrido[1–2-a:3,4-b′]diindole ring system. It was first isolated as a red pigment from the marine sponge Fascaplysinopsis bergquist collected in the South Pacific near Fiji in 1988. Fascaplysin possesses a broad range of in vitro biological activities including analgesic, antimicrobial, antifungal, antiviral, antimalarial, anti-angiogenic, and antiproliferative activity against numerous cancer cell lines.

Synthesis

The first total synthesis of fascaplysin was performed in seven steps from indole in 1990. Fascaplysin and its derivatives can be synthesized from tryptamine, beta-carboline, indoleketones, and indigo.

References

Alkaloids
Heterocyclic compounds with 5 rings
Nitrogen heterocycles